Lucy Katherine Pinder (born 20 December 1983) is a British glamour model and actress. Her career began in 2003 after being discovered by a freelance photographer on Bournemouth beach and has appeared in such publications as the Daily Star tabloid newspaper and magazines FHM, Loaded and Nuts.

Career

Modeling career
 Pinder first appeared topless in Nuts in 2007. With vital statistics of 32F-26-34, the Australian magazine Ralph declared that she had the "Best Breasts in the World" in 2007.

Pinder has appeared on FHM list of the "100 Sexiest Women in the World" 2007 (No. 92), 2006 (No. 35), and 2005 (No. 16), and, in 2010, she was head of the Bennetts Babe Squad.

Pinder was responsible for a weekly advice column in Nuts, entitled "The Truth About Women".

Television appearances
In 2004, Pinder appeared on Living TV's series I'm Famous and Frightened!, spending the weekend at Bolsover Castle in Derbyshire investigating ghosts and spirits. She appeared in the music video for the 4-4-2 song "Come On England" in 2004.

On 31 December 2005, Pinder appeared on Sky Sports as a celebrity soccerette on Soccer AM, during which she wore a Southampton F.C. jersey. She also sat on the sofa answering questions on topics such as modelling and football.

In September 2007, Pinder appeared as a contestant on a special edition of The Weakest Link, entitled "Wags and Glamour Girls".

 On 15 January 2008, Pinder made her presenter debut for Nuts TV. She presented the Nuts TV live show on six further occasions in February and March 2008 and also presented Overexposed, which was a series on Nuts TV giving hints and tips to the aspiring amateur glamour photographer. Subsequently, she has appeared on the MTV channel's TMF, presenting, in conjunction with Kayleigh Pearson, Pinder and Pearson's Late-Night Love-in – a "countdown of saucy music videos."

In February 2008, Pinder made a cameo appearance, along with Michelle Marsh, in Hotel Babylon on BBC One. In February 2010, Pinder appeared on BBC Three's The Real Hustle Undercover, in which she pulled a switch on an unsuspecting punter.

In addition, Pinder has appeared on the cover of several DVDs and in photo shoots for magazines, such as Loaded and Maxim.

In 2016, Pinder made her Bollywood debut with the film Waarrior Savitri.

Celebrity Big Brother
From 2 January 2009, Pinder appeared in the sixth series of Celebrity Big Brother. She revealed that "thick" people irritate her. She was the first housemate to be voted out, on 9 January (Day 8) with 57% of the public vote. Pinder declared her wish to leave the Big Brother house after being driven to distraction by the constant rapping of housemate Coolio.

Charity work
 Pinder has worked closely with a number of wildlife charities, getting involved in fund raising for TigerTime, the David Shepherd Wildlife Foundation, and International Animal Rescue. She was also an ambassador for Kick 4 Life, a charity that uses football to fight poverty and disease in developing countries. She has also produced original works of art for sale in charity auctions for Keech Hospice Care and the Sports for All campaign.

Pinder has also volunteered her time at Cats Protection as part of the charity's campaign "I'm A Celebrity... Let Me Volunteer!", and she was a judge for National Cat Awards in the "Hero Cat" category in 2012.

Pinder has worked with Help for Heroes, a British charity launched in 2007 to help provide better facilities for British servicemen and women who have been wounded or injured in the line of duty, and she has appeared in the 2011 and 2014 Hot Shots Calendar.

Pinder and Rhian Sugden continue to support the MCAC (Male Cancer Awareness Campaign), and they took part in the five-mile "London Strut" awareness initiative in December 2013.

Pinder supported the "Stars & Stripes 2014 Celebrity Auction" by donating an original drawing of hers that was auctioned off, with the proceeds going to TigerTime.

Filmography

References

External links

 

1983 births
21st-century English actresses
Actors from Winchester
Actresses from Hampshire
Big Brother (British TV series) contestants
English female models
English film actresses
English television actresses
English television talk show hosts
Glamour models
Living people
Mass media people from Winchester
Page 3 girls
People educated at Peter Symonds College